is a Japanese footballer who plays as a midfielder for J2 League club FC Ryukyu.

Career
After playing in the youth team of JEF United Chiba and in Ritsumeikan University, Kato opted for a career of a globetrotter. After spells with Sacachispas and FC Machida Zelvia in the 2012 J.League Division 2, he played two seasons with FK Rudar Pljevlja in the Montenegrin First League. Next he played with Polish side Podbeskidzie Bielsko-Biała in the 2015–16 Ekstraklasa, before joining Beroe Stara Zagora playing in the Bulgarian First League. In March 2019 Kato became part of the ranks of Polish club Widzew Łódź. In October 2019, he signed for Gibraltar National League side St Joseph's.

International career
On 26 May 2017, Kato received his first call up for Japan for the friendly game against Syria and a 2018 FIFA World Cup qualification match against Iraq.

Honours
Rudar Pljevlja
Montenegrin First League: 2014–15

References

External links

J. League (#27)

1989 births
Living people
Ritsumeikan University alumni
Association football people from Wakayama Prefecture
Association football midfielders
Japanese footballers
FC Machida Zelvia players
FK Rudar Pljevlja players
Podbeskidzie Bielsko-Biała players
PFC Beroe Stara Zagora players
Sagan Tosu players
Widzew Łódź players
FK Iskra Danilovgrad players
St Joseph's F.C. players
J2 League players
Kohei Kato
Montenegrin First League players
Ekstraklasa players
First Professional Football League (Bulgaria) players
II liga players
Kohei Kato
Expatriate footballers in Montenegro
Expatriate footballers in Poland
Expatriate footballers in Bulgaria
Expatriate footballers in Gibraltar
Japanese expatriate sportspeople in Montenegro
Japanese expatriate sportspeople in Poland
Anadia F.C. players